

Events

Pre-1600
AD 69 – Antonius Primus enters Rome to claim the title of Emperor for Nero's former general Vespasian.
1192 – Richard I of England is captured and imprisoned by Leopold V of Austria on his way home to England after the Third Crusade.
1334 – Cardinal Jacques Fournier, a Cistercian monk, is elected Pope Benedict XII.

1601–1900
1803 – The Louisiana Purchase is completed at a ceremony in New Orleans.
1808 – Peninsular War: The Siege of Zaragoza begins.
1832 – HMS Clio under the command of Captain Onslow arrives at Port Egmont under orders to take possession of the Falkland Islands.
1860 – South Carolina becomes the first state to attempt to secede from the United States with the South Carolina Declaration of Secession.

1901–present
1915 – World War I: The last Australian troops are evacuated from Gallipoli.
1917 – Cheka, the first Soviet secret police force, is founded.
1924 – Adolf Hitler is released from Landsberg Prison.
1941 – World War II: First battle of the American Volunteer Group, better known as the "Flying Tigers", in Kunming, China.
1942 – World War II: Japanese air forces bomb Calcutta, India.
1946 – It's a Wonderful Life premieres at the Globe Theatre in New York to mixed reviews. [1]
  1946   – An earthquake in Nankaidō, Japan causes a tsunami which kills at least one thousand people and destroys 36,000 homes.
1948 – Indonesian National Revolution: The Dutch military captures Yogyakarta, the temporary capital of the newly formed Republic of Indonesia.
1951 – The EBR-1 in Arco, Idaho becomes the first nuclear power plant to generate electricity. The electricity powered four light bulbs.
1952 – A United States Air Force C-124 crashes and burns in Moses Lake, Washington, killing 87 of the 115 people on board.
1955 – Cardiff is proclaimed the capital city of Wales, United Kingdom.
1957 – The initial production version of the Boeing 707 makes its first flight.
1967 – A Pennsylvania Railroad Budd Metroliner exceeds  on their New York Division, also present-day Amtrak's Northeast Corridor. 
1973 – Assassination of Luis Carrero Blanco: A car bomb planted by ETA in Madrid kills three people, including the Prime Minister of Spain, Admiral Luis Carrero Blanco.
1984 – The Summit Tunnel fire, one of the largest transportation tunnel fires in history, burns after a freight train carrying over one million liters of gasoline derails near the town of Todmorden, England, in the Pennines.
  1984   – Disappearance of Jonelle Matthews from Greeley, Colorado. The cause of death "was a gunshot wound to the head."
1985 – Pope John Paul II announces the institution of World Youth Day.
1987 – In the worst peacetime sea disaster, the passenger ferry Doña Paz sinks after colliding with the oil tanker MT Vector in the Tablas Strait of the Philippines, killing an estimated 4,000 people (1,749 official).
1989 – The United States invasion of Panama deposes Manuel Noriega.
1991 – A Missouri court sentences the Palestinian militant Zein Isa and his wife Maria to death for the honor killing of their daughter Palestina.
1995 – NATO begins peacekeeping in Bosnia.
  1995   – American Airlines Flight 965, a Boeing 757, crashes into a mountain 50 km north of Cali, Colombia, killing 159 of the 163 people on board.
1999 – Macau is handed over to China by Portugal.
2004 – A gang of thieves steal £26.5 million worth of currency from the Donegall Square West headquarters of Northern Bank in Belfast, Northern Ireland, United Kingdom, one of the largest bank robberies in British history. 
2007 – Elizabeth II becomes the oldest monarch in the history of the United Kingdom, surpassing Queen Victoria, who lived for 81 years and 243 days.
  2007   – The Portrait of Suzanne Bloch (1904), by the Spanish artist Pablo Picasso, and O Lavrador de Café by Brazilian modernist painter Cândido Portinari, are stolen from the São Paulo Museum of Art in Brazil. Both will be recovered a few weeks later.
2019 – The United States Space Force becomes the first new branch of the United States Armed Forces since 1947.

Births

Pre-1600
1494 – Oronce Finé, French mathematician and cartographer (d. 1555)
1496 – Joseph ha-Kohen, historian and physician (d. 1575)
1537 – John III, king of Sweden (d. 1592)
1576 – John Sarkander, Moravian priest and saint (d. 1620)

1601–1900
1626 – Veit Ludwig von Seckendorff, German scholar and politician (d. 1692)
1629 – Pieter de Hooch, Dutch painter (d. 1684)
1641 – Urban Hjärne, Swedish chemist, geologist, and physician (d. 1724)
1740 – Arthur Lee, American physician and diplomat (d. 1792)
1786 – Pietro Raimondi, Italian composer (d. 1853)
1792 – Nicolas Toussaint Charlet, French painter and educator (d. 1845)
1806 – Martín Carrera, Mexican general and president (1855) (d. 1871)
1812 – Laura M. Hawley Thurston, American poet and educator (d. 1842)
1838 – Edwin Abbott Abbott, English theologian, author, and educator (d. 1926)
1841 – Ferdinand Buisson, French academic and politician, Nobel Prize laureate (d. 1932)
1861 – Ferdinand Bonn, German actor (d. 1933)
  1861   – Ivana Kobilca, Slovenian painter (d. 1926)
1865 – Elsie de Wolfe, American actress and interior decorator (d. 1950)
1868 – Harvey Samuel Firestone, American businessman, founded the Firestone Tire and Rubber Company (d. 1938)
1869 – Charley Grapewin, American actor (d. 1956)
1871 – Henry Kimball Hadley, American composer and conductor (d. 1937)
1873 – Kan'ichi Asakawa, Japanese historian, author, and academic (d. 1948)
  1873   – Mehmet Akif Ersoy, Turkish poet, academic, and politician (d. 1936)
1881 – Branch Rickey, American baseball player and manager (d. 1965)
1886 – Hazel Hotchkiss Wightman, American tennis player and businessman (d. 1974)
1888 – Yitzhak Baer, German-Israeli historian and academic (d. 1980)
  1888   – Fred Merkle, American baseball player and manager (d. 1956)
1890 – Yvonne Arnaud, French pianist, actress and singer (d. 1958)
  1890   – Jaroslav Heyrovský, Czech chemist and academic, Nobel Prize laureate (d. 1967)
1891 – Erik Almlöf, Swedish triple jumper (d. 1971)
1894 – Robert Menzies, Australian lawyer and politician, 12th Prime Minister of Australia (d. 1978)
1898 – Konstantinos Dovas, Greek general and politician, 156th Prime Minister of Greece (d. 1973)
  1898   – Irene Dunne, American actress and singer (d. 1990)
1899 – Martyn Lloyd-Jones, Welsh preacher and physician (d. 1981)
1900 – Lissy Arna, German film actress (d. 1964)

1901–present
1901 – Robert J. Van de Graaff, American physicist and academic, invented the Van de Graaff generator (d. 1967)
1902 – Prince George, Duke of Kent (d. 1942)
  1902   – Sidney Hook, American philosopher and author (d. 1989)
1904 – Spud Davis, American baseball player, coach, and manager (d. 1984)
  1904   – Yevgenia Ginzburg, Russian author (d. 1977)
1905 – Bill O'Reilly, Australian cricketer and sportscaster (d. 1992)
1907 – Paul Francis Webster, American soldier and songwriter (d. 1984)
1908 – Dennis Morgan, American actor and singer (d. 1994)
1909 – Vakkom Majeed, Indian journalist and politician (d. 2000)
1911 – Hortense Calisher, American author (d. 2009)
1914 – Harry F. Byrd Jr., American lieutenant, publisher, and politician (d. 2013)
1915 – Aziz Nesin, Turkish author and poet (d. 1995)
1916 – Michel Chartrand, Canadian trade union leader and activist (d. 2010)
1917 – David Bohm, American-English physicist, neuropsychologist, and philosopher (d. 1992)
  1917   – Cahit Külebi, Turkish poet and author (d. 1997)
  1917   – Audrey Totter, American actress (d. 2013)
1918 – Jean Marchand, Canadian trade union leader and politician, 43rd Secretary of State for Canada (d. 1988)
1920 – Väinö Linna, Finnish author (d. 1992)
1921 – George Roy Hill, American director, producer, and screenwriter (d. 2002)
  1922   – Beverly Pepper, American sculptor and painter (d. 2020)
1924 – Charlie Callas, American actor and comedian (d. 2011)
  1924   – Judy LaMarsh, Canadian soldier, lawyer, and politician, 42nd Secretary of State for Canada (d. 1980)
1925 – Benito Lorenzi, Italian footballer (d. 2007)
1926 – Geoffrey Howe, Welsh lawyer and politician, Deputy Prime Minister of the United Kingdom (d. 2015)
  1926   – Otto Graf Lambsdorff, German lawyer and politician, German Federal Minister of Economics (d. 2009)
1927 – Michael Beaumont, 22nd Seigneur of Sark, English engineer and politician (d. 2016)
  1927   – Jim Simpson, American sportscaster (d. 2016)
  1927   – Kim Young-sam, South Korean soldier and politician, 7th President of South Korea (d. 2015)
1931 – Mala Powers, American actress (d. 2007) 
1932 – John Hillerman, American actor (d. 2017)
1933 – Jean Carnahan, American author and politician
  1933   – Olavi Salonen, Finnish runner
  1933   – Rik Van Looy, Belgian cyclist
1935 – Khalid Ibadulla, Pakistani cricketer and sportscaster
1939 – Kathryn Joosten, American actress (d. 2012)
  1939   – Kim Weston, American soul singer
1942 – Rana Bhagwandas, Pakistani lawyer and judge, Chief Justice of Pakistan (d. 2015)
  1942   – Bob Hayes, American sprinter and football player (d. 2002)
  1942   – Jean-Claude Trichet, French banker and economist
1944 – Ray Martin, Australian television host and journalist
1945 – Peter Criss, American singer-songwriter, drummer, and producer 
  1945   – Sivakant Tiwari, Indian-Singaporean lawyer and author (d. 2010)
1946 – Uri Geller, Israeli-English magician and psychic
  1946   – Sonny Perdue, American politician, 31st United States Secretary of Agriculture, 81st Governor of Georgia
  1946   – Dick Wolf, American director, producer, and screenwriter
1947 – Gigliola Cinquetti, Italian singer-songwriter
1948 – Alan Parsons, English keyboard player and producer 
  1948   – Mitsuko Uchida, Japanese pianist
1949 – Soumaïla Cissé, Malian engineer and politician
1950 – Arturo Márquez, Mexican-American composer
1951 – Nuala O'Loan, Baroness O'Loan, Northern Irish academic and police ombudsman
  1951   – Marta Russell, American author and activist (d. 2013)
1952 – Jenny Agutter, English actress
1954 – Michael Badalucco, American actor
  1954   – Sandra Cisneros, American author and poet
1955 – David Breashears, American mountaineer, director, and producer
  1955   – Binali Yıldırım, Turkish lawyer and politician, Turkish Minister of Transport
  1955   – Martin Schulz, German politician
1956 – Mohamed Ould Abdel Aziz, Mauritanian general and politician, President of Mauritania
  1956   – Guy Babylon, American keyboard player and songwriter (d. 2009)
  1956   – Blanche Baker, American actress and screenwriter
  1956   – Junji Hirata, Japanese wrestler
  1956   – Andrew Mackenzie, Scottish geologist and businessman
  1956   – Anita Ward, American disco/R&B singer
1957 – Billy Bragg, English singer-songwriter and guitarist
  1957   – Anna Vissi, Cypriot singer-songwriter and actress 
  1957   – Mike Watt, American singer-songwriter and bass player
1958 – Doug Nordquist, American high jumper
  1958   – James Thomson, American biologist and academic
1959 – George Coupland, Scottish scientist
  1959   – Hildegard Körner, German runner
  1959   – Jackie Fox, American bass player 
  1959   – Kazimierz Marcinkiewicz, Polish physicist and politician, 12th Prime Minister of Poland
  1959   – Trent Tucker, American basketball player and sportscaster
1960 – Nalo Hopkinson, Jamaican-Canadian author and educator
  1960   – Kim Ki-duk, South Korean director, producer, and screenwriter
1961 – Mohammad Fouad, Egyptian singer-songwriter and actor
  1961   – Mike Keneally, American singer-songwriter and guitarist 
  1961   – Freddie Spencer, American motorcycle racer
1964 – Mark Coleman, American mixed martial artist and wrestler
1965 – Rich Gannon, American football player and sportscaster
1966 – Matt Neal, English racing driver
  1966   – Veronica Pershina, Russian-American figure skater and coach
  1966   – Chris Robinson, American singer-songwriter and guitarist 
1968 – Joe Cornish, English actor, director, and screenwriter
  1968   – Karl Wendlinger, Austrian racing driver
1969 – Alain de Botton, Swiss-English philosopher and author
  1969   – Zahra Ouaziz, Moroccan runner
1970 – Grant Flower, Zimbabwean cricketer and coach
  1970   – Jörg Schmidt, German footballer
1972 – Anders Odden, Norwegian guitarist, songwriter, and producer 
  1972   – Anja Rücker, German sprinter
1973 – David Nedohin, Canadian curler and sportscaster
1974 – Die, Japanese guitarist, songwriter, and producer 
1975 – Bartosz Bosacki, Polish footballer
1976 – Nenad Vučković, Croatian footballer
1978 – Andrei Markov, Russian-Canadian ice hockey player
  1978   – Geremi Njitap, Cameroon footballer
  1978   – Bouabdellah Tahri, French runner
  1978   – Yoon Kye-sang, South Korean singer
1979 – Michael Rogers, Australian cyclist
1980 – Israel Castro, Mexican footballer
  1980   – Ashley Cole, English footballer
  1980   – Anthony da Silva, French-Portuguese footballer
  1980   – Martín Demichelis, Argentinian footballer
1982 – Mohammad Asif, Pakistani cricketer
  1982   – Kasper Klausen, Danish footballer
  1982   – David Wright, American baseball player
1983 – Jonah Hill, American actor, producer, and screenwriter
1987 – Malcolm Jenkins, American football player
1990 – JoJo, American singer and actress
1991 – Rachael Boyle, Scottish footballer
  1991   – Jillian Rose Reed, American actress
  1991   – Fabian Schär, Swiss footballer 
  1991   – Jorginho, Brazilian footballer
1992 – Ksenia Makarova, Russian-American figure skater
1993 – Robeisy Ramírez, Cuban boxer
1997 – De'Aaron Fox, American basketball player
  1997   – Suzuka Nakamoto, Japanese singer
 1998 – Kylian Mbappé, French footballer
2001 – Facundo Pellistri, Uruguayan footballer

Deaths

Pre-1600
 217 – Zephyrinus, pope of the Catholic Church
 910 – Alfonso III, king of Asturias
 977 – Fujiwara no Kanemichi, Japanese statesman (b. 925)
1295 – Margaret of Provence, French queen (b. 1221)
1326 – Peter of Moscow, Russian metropolitan bishop
1340 – John I, duke of Bavaria (b. 1329)
1355 – Stefan Dušan, emperor of Serbia  (b. 1308)
1539 – Johannes Lupi, Flemish composer (b. 1506)
1552 – Katharina von Bora, wife of Martin Luther (b. 1499)
1590 – Ambroise Paré, French physician and surgeon (b. 1510)

1601–1900
1658 – Jean Jannon, French designer and typefounder (b. 1580)
1722 – Kangxi, emperor of the Qing Dynasty (b. 1654)
1723 – Augustus Quirinus Rivinus, German physician and botanist (b. 1652)
1740 – Richard Boyle, 2nd Viscount Shannon, English field marshal and politician, Governor of Portsmouth (b. 1675)
1765 – Louis, dauphin of France (b. 1729)
1768 – Carlo Innocenzo Frugoni, Italian poet and academic (b. 1692)
1783 – Antonio Soler, Spanish priest and composer (b. 1729)
1812 – Sacagawea, American explorer (b. 1788)
1820 – John Bell, American farmer (b. 1750)
1856 – Francesco Bentivegna, Italian activist (b. 1820)
1862 – Robert Knox, Scottish surgeon and zoologist (b. 1791)
1880 – Gaspar Tochman, Polish-American colonel and lawyer (b. 1797)
1893 – George C. Magoun, American businessman (b. 1840)

1901–present
1915 – Upendrakishore Ray, Indian painter and composer (b. 1863)
1916 – Arthur Morgan, Australian politician, 16th Premier of Queensland (b. 1856)
1917 – Lucien Petit-Breton, French-Argentinian cyclist (b. 1882)
1919 – Philip Fysh, English-Australian politician, 12th Premier of Tasmania (b. 1835)
1920 – Linton Hope, English sailor and architect (b. 1863)
1921 – Julius Richard Petri, German microbiologist (b. 1852)
1927 – Frederick Semple, American golfer and tennis player (b. 1872)
1929 – Émile Loubet, French lawyer and politician, 8th President of France (b. 1838)
1935 – Martin O'Meara, Irish-Australian sergeant, Victoria Cross recipient (b. 1882)
1937 – Erich Ludendorff, German general (b. 1865)
1938 – Annie Armstrong, American missionary (b. 1850)
  1938   – Matilda Howell, American archer (b. 1859)
1939 – Hans Langsdorff, German captain (b. 1894)
1941 – Igor Severyanin, Russian-Estonian poet and author (b. 1887)
1950 – Enrico Mizzi, Maltese lawyer and politician, 6th Prime Minister of Malta (b. 1885)
1954 – James Hilton, English-American author and screenwriter (b. 1900)
1956 – Ramón Carrillo, Argentinian neurologist and physician (b. 1906)
1959 – Juhan Simm, Estonian composer and conductor (b. 1885)
1961 – Moss Hart, American director and playwright (b. 1904)
  1961   – Earle Page, Australian soldier and politician, 11th Prime Minister of Australia (b. 1880)
1968 – John Steinbeck, American novelist and short story writer, Nobel Prize laureate (b. 1902)
1971 – Roy O. Disney, American banker and businessman, co-founded The Walt Disney Company (b. 1893)
1972 – Adolfo Orsi, Italian businessman (b. 1888)
1973 – Luis Carrero Blanco, Spanish admiral and politician, 69th President of the Government of Spain (b. 1904; assassinated)
  1973   – Bobby Darin, American singer-songwriter and actor (b. 1936)
1974 – Rajani Palme Dutt, English journalist and politician (b. 1896)
  1974   – André Jolivet, French composer and conductor (b. 1905)
1976 – Richard J. Daley, American lawyer and politician, 48th Mayor of Chicago (b. 1902)
1981 – Dimitris Rontiris, Greek actor and director (b. 1899)
1982 – Arthur Rubinstein, Polish-American pianist and composer (b. 1887)
1984 – Stanley Milgram, American psychologist and academic (b. 1933)
  1984   – Dmitry Ustinov, Minister of Defence of the Soviet Union (1976-84) (b. 1908)
1986 – Joe DeSa, American baseball player (b. 1959)
1991 – Simone Beck, French chef and author (b. 1904)
  1991   – Sam Rabin, English wrestler, singer, and sculptor (b. 1903)
  1991   – Albert Van Vlierberghe, Belgian cyclist (b. 1942)
1993 – W. Edwards Deming, American statistician, author, and academic (b. 1900)
  1993   – Nazife Güran, Turkish composer and educator (b. 1921)
1994 – Dean Rusk, American lawyer, and politician, 54th United States Secretary of State (b. 1909)
1995 – Madge Sinclair, Jamaican-American actress (b. 1938)
1996 – Carl Sagan, American astronomer, astrophysicist, and cosmologist (b. 1934)
1997 – Denise Levertov, English-American poet and translator (b. 1923)
  1997   – Dick Spooner, English cricketer (b. 1919)
  1997   – Dawn Steel, American film producer (b. 1946)
1998 – Alan Lloyd Hodgkin, English physiologist and biophysicist, Nobel Prize laureate (b. 1916)
1999 – Riccardo Freda, Egyptian-Italian director and screenwriter (b. 1909)
  1999   – Hank Snow, Canadian-American singer-songwriter and guitarist (b. 1914)
2001 – Léopold Sédar Senghor, Senegalese poet and politician, 1st President of Senegal (b. 1906)
2005 – Raoul Bott, Hungarian-American mathematician and academic (b. 1923)
2006 – Anne Rogers Clark, American dog breeder and trainer (b. 1929)
2008 – Adrian Mitchell, English author, poet, and playwright (b. 1932)
  2008   – Robert Mulligan, American director and producer (b. 1925)
  2008   – Igor Troubetzkoy, Russian aristocrat and racing driver (b. 1912)
2009 – Brittany Murphy, American actress and singer (b. 1977)
  2009   – Arnold Stang, American actor (b. 1918)
2010 – James Robert Mann, American colonel, lawyer, and politician (b. 1920)
  2010   – K. P. Ratnam, Sri Lankan academic and politician (b. 1914)
2011 – Barry Reckord, Jamaican playwright and screenwriter (b. 1926)
2012 – Stan Charlton, English footballer and manager (b. 1929)
  2012   – Robert Juniper, Australian painter and sculptor (b. 1929)
  2012   – Victor Merzhanov, Russian pianist and educator (b. 1919)
2013 – Pyotr Bolotnikov, Russian runner (b. 1930)
2014 – Per-Ingvar Brånemark, Swedish surgeon and academic (b. 1929)
  2014   – John Freeman, English lawyer, politician, and diplomat, British Ambassador to the United States (b. 1915)
2020 – Fanny Waterman, British pianist (b. 1920)
  2020   – Ezra Vogel, American sociologist (b. 1930)
2022 – Franco Harris, American football player (b. 1950)

Holidays and observances
Abolition of Slavery Day, also known as Fête des Cafres (Réunion, French Guiana)
Bo Aung Kyaw Day (Myanmar)
Christian feast day:
Dominic of Silos
O Clavis
Ursicinus of Saint-Ursanne
Katharina von Bora (Lutheran)
December 20 (Eastern Orthodox liturgics)
Earliest date for Winter solstice's eve (Northern Hemisphere), and its related observances:
Yaldā (Iran)
International Human Solidarity Day (International)
Macau Special Administrative Region Establishment Day (Macau)

References

External links

 BBC: On This Day
 
 Historical Events on December 20

Days of the year
December